Vannino Chiti (born 26 December 1947) is an Italian politician, former president of Tuscany and Minister for Constitutional Reforms and Parliamentary Relations.

Biography 
Chiti graduated in philosophy and has always studied the history of catholicism.

In 1970, Chiti joined the Italian Communist Party and became a city councilor in Pistoia, of which he has also been mayor from 1982 to 1985. From 1992 to 2000, Chiti has been President of Tuscany, leading a center-left junta.

He is elected to the Chamber of Deputies with the Democrats of the Left in 2001 and in 2006, year in which Chiti has been appointed Minister for Constitutional Reforms and Parliamentary Relations in the Prodi II Cabinet.

In 2008 and 2013, Chiti is elected to the Senate with the Democratic Party and has been Vice-president of the Senate from 2008 to 2013. A member of the left-wing of the PD, Chiti has been politically considered very close to Giuseppe Civati and, along with few others, didn't vote the Rosato electoral law.

Chiti decided not to run for the 2018 general elections, ending after 17 years his experience in Parliament.

References

External links 
Files about his parliamentary activities (in Italian): XIV, XV, XVI, XVII legislature

1947 births
Living people
Government ministers of Italy
Italian Communist Party politicians
Democratic Party of the Left politicians
Democrats of the Left politicians
Democratic Party (Italy) politicians
20th-century Italian politicians
21st-century Italian politicians
People from Pistoia
Mayors of Pistoia
Presidents of Tuscany